Minaq (also Romanized as Mīnaq and Meynaq; also known as Meyna, Mīna, and Minar) is a village in Bedevostan-e Sharqi Rural District, in the Central District of Heris County, East Azerbaijan Province, Iran. At the 2006 census, its population was 815, in 195 families.

References 

Populated places in Heris County